Yulin is a prefecture-level city in the Shanbei region of Shaanxi province, China, bordering Inner Mongolia to the north, Shanxi to the east, and Ningxia to the west.

History
Yulin played host to the 11th CHIME (European Foundation for Chinese Music Research) conference in August 2006. In 2017, 26–29 August, the 1st IGU-AGLE Commission's conference on 'Global Rural Development and Land Capacity Building.' was held in Yulin University.

Geography
Yulin is the northernmost prefecture-level city of Shaanxi, and borders Ordos City (Inner Mongolia) to the north, Xinzhou and Lüliang (Shanxi) to the east, Yan'an to the south, and Wuzhong (Ningxia) to the west. To the north and northwest of the city lies the Ordos Desert, though the countryside is very green due to the many small shrubs which have been planted to slow the process of desertification. The city is based in a valley which extends north–south, which rises to a large vantage point to the north east, from which there are views of the west and northwest.

Lake Hongjiannao 
Lake Hongjiannao lies on the border of Yulin and Ordos City, Inner Mongolia (39°06′N, 109°53′E). It is China's largest "desert freshwater lake". The lake is relatively recent, formed around 1929 due to increased rainfall in the early 20th century; before, the basin was a wetland.

The lake is supplied by four rivers, but there is no outflow. The shrinking has been attributed to reservoir construction, mining, and agricultural irrigation.

Lake Hongjiannao is an important breeding habitat for relict gull, a species classified as "vulnerable" by the International Union for Conservation of Nature (IUCN). It is estimated that up to 5,000 pairs breed there, making it the largest breeding colony of relict gulls. Shrinking of the lake and changes in water quality are threatening the colony.

Climate
Yulin has a continental, monsoon-influenced semi-arid climate (Köppen BSk), with very cold, rather long winters, and hot and somewhat humid summers. Spring is especially prone to sandstorms blowing in from the northwest. There is only  of precipitation annually, 73% of which occurs from June to September. Due to the aridity, diurnal temperature variation is large for most of the year, averaging  annually. With monthly percent possible sunshine ranging from 60% in three months to 65% in four months, the city receives 2,780 hours of bright sunshine annually.

Administration
Yulin consists of two districts, one county-level city and nine counties.

Economy
Coal mining is the main industry of Yulin. There is a new oil-field project (2005+) just to the west of Yulin which is drilling wells for natural gas, and this has brought a good deal of money into the local economy.

This new oil/gas development is the current largest onshore project cooperated by the PetroChina and International Energy Company (Shell) in Mainland of China since 1999 (Product Sharing Contract (PSC) signed). In 2005, this project progressed to the construction and drilling phase and delivered gas into Shaanxi-Jing No.2 pipeline in 2007. The target annual gas production is 3 billion cubic meters (BCM) after this project reaches its full production capacity.

Transportation 
Yulin Yuyang Airport
Shenyan Railway
G1812 Cangyu Expressway
G65 Baotou–Maoming Expressway
China National Highway 210

Culture
Because of its relative isolation, a considerable amount of classical architecture remains in the city proper including the original city wall, some of which has been restored.  Other cultural relics include the Zhen Bei Tai watchtower, built during the Ming dynasty, which is the largest troop fortress built on the entire Great Wall, with original and restored pieces of the original Great Wall juxtaposed on both sides. There is a large restoration in process on this area of the Great Wall. In addition, pieces of the ancient Great Wall built during the Qin dynasty are scattered along the outskirts of town. There is also the Red Stone Gorge, a canyon lined with grottoes containing carved ancient writing and Buddhist art. The town also contains an ancient pagoda.

The Chinese dialect of Jin is spoken in Yulin.

Environment

Notable people
 Li Zicheng (1606–1645), rebel leader that established the Shun dynasty.
 Han Shizhong, Southern Song general.
 Hu Qili, former leader of Chinese Communist Party.

Sister cities
After the mayor of Gillette, Wyoming visited a coal conference in China, a delegation from Yulin went to Gillette. These meetings eventually led both to become sister cities in 2012.

References

External links

Official website of Yulin Government
Yulin University
How to study at the Yulin University
CREC (The Research Centre for the Recovery of Ecology and Culture in the Loess-Plateau)

 
Cities in Shaanxi